Fichera is a surname. Notable people with the surname include:

Gaetano Fichera (1922–1996), Italian mathematician
Fichera's existence principle
Joseph Fichera, American business executive
Marco Fichera (born 1993), Italian fencer